Sayed Abdul Karim Hashimi is an Afghan politician. He is a former Governor of Logar Province, he served from December 2005 to July 2007.

References 

Governors of Logar Province
Living people
Year of birth missing (living people)